Dean Wareham is the self-titled debut studio album by singer/songwriter Dean Wareham, released on March 11, 2014, through Double Feature Records in the US and Sonic Cathedral in the UK/Europe.

Track listing 

Cover design by Sharon Lock.

References 

2014 albums